Milner Dam is a rockfill dam near Burley in south central Idaho. It impounds the Snake River in a reservoir named Milner Lake. The dam spans the river across two islands, with three embankments.

Milner Dam was authorized for construction as a privately capitalized venture under the 1894 Carey Act, a precursor to the 1902 Reclamation Act. Ira Burton Perrine, a local rancher, chose the site and recruited financial backers, including Salt Lake City banker Stanley B. Milner and eastern investors Frank H. Buhl and Peter L. Kimberly. The Buhl-Kimberly Corporation built the dam and the Twin Falls Canal in 1903–1905. Milner Dam's primary purpose is irrigation but it also produces hydroelectricity. It is currently owned and operated by Milner Dam, Inc.

The lake covers 4,000 acres (16 km2).

Inspections in 1988 indicated a high risk of dam failure in an earthquake. The 1992 powerplant has 46 and 11.5 MW generators, with a small 800 KW generator for low-flow conditions. Water for the powerplant is drawn from the Twin Falls Canal during seasons when water is not needed for irrigation.

Milner Dam was placed on the National Register of Historic Places on July 10, 1986.

See also

Gooding Milner canal
List of dams in the Columbia River watershed

References

External links
Milner Dam at the Twin Falls Canal Company

1905 establishments in Idaho
Buildings and structures in Jerome County, Idaho
Buildings and structures in Twin Falls County, Idaho
Dams completed in 1905
Dams on the National Register of Historic Places in Idaho
Dams on the Snake River
Energy infrastructure completed in 1992
Historic American Engineering Record in Idaho
Hydroelectric power plants in Idaho
Industrial buildings and structures on the National Register of Historic Places in Idaho
National Register of Historic Places in Jerome County, Idaho
National Register of Historic Places in Twin Falls County, Idaho